Roy D. Mercer was a fictional character created by American disc jockeys Brent Douglas and Phil Stone on radio station KMOD-FM in Tulsa, Oklahoma. Douglas, who performed Mercer's voice, used the character as a vehicle for comedy sketches in which he performed prank calls. The two released twelve albums of prank call recordings under the Roy D. Mercer name via Virgin Records and Capitol Records. The character was retired in 2012 upon Stone's death.

History
Brent Douglas and Phil Stone, disc jockeys at rock music radio station KMOD-FM in Tulsa, Oklahoma, created the Roy D. Mercer character in 1993. Initially, they used the character on comedy sketches for the radio station. Originally, the prank call sketches were a part of KMOD's morning show. By 1997, Capitol Records Nashville began issuing the sketches on compact disc. The first was titled How Big a Boy Are Ya?, Volume 1, in reference to one of Mercer's catch phrases. Twelve Roy D. Mercer compilation albums have been released on the Capitol and Virgin Records labels. A Virgin Records Nashville executive noted that Mercer's early albums managed to sell between 250,000 and 300,000 copies, primarily due to word of mouth, without any promotion to consumers or radio airplay of the album tracks.

In most of the sketches, Mercer will demand that the recipient of a call pay him money for some incident, and if the recipient refuses, he will threaten them with violence. Mercer has been described as speaking with "a mush-mouthed Southern drawl" and his style of comedy has been described as "not exactly obscene ... [but] border[ing] on offensive". Many of the recipients of the calls are suggested by their friends who supply Mercer with information about the potential recipients. Several notable people that Douglas and Stone had called were Bill Goldberg (”Roy Vs. Goldberg”), Chris Bray, production manager for Steppenwolf (“Tragic Carpet Ride”), and cinematographer Barry Markowitz, as suggested by Billy Bob Thornton (“Yankee in a Strange Land”).

On October 12, 2012, the Phil and Brent Show ended its 27-year run with KMOD-FM radio. Forty days later, on November 21, Phil Stone died from causes related to heart disease at the age of 57.

John Bean's "Leroy Mercer" character of the 1980s
Many claim that Roy D. Mercer was inspired by "Leroy Mercer," a character created in Tennessee by Knoxville resident John R. Bean, who made prank calls circulated by hand-to-hand tape exchange in the early 1980s. Leroy Mercer, voiced by John Bean, also called individuals and businesses threatening an "ass-whuppin".  There are many parallels and similarities to the calls, with Roy D. Mercer using many of the former Leroy Mercer's lines. John Bean died from cancer in his early 30s in 1984; Stone and Douglas said that they originally invented their Roy D. Mercer character in 1990 before his official creation in 1993, and that part of the name and lines used in Roy D. Mercer's recordings was copied from John Bean.

Discography

Studio albums

Compilation albums

Music videos

References 

Capitol Records artists
Fictional characters from Tulsa, Oklahoma
Comedy radio characters
Prank calling
Virgin Records artists
Radio characters introduced in 1993